In mathematics, set A is a subset of a set B if all elements of A are also elements of B; B is then a superset of A. It is possible for A and B to be equal; if they are unequal, then A is a proper subset of B. The relationship of one set being a subset of another is called inclusion (or sometimes containment). A is a subset of B may also be expressed as B includes (or contains) A or A is included (or contained) in B. A k-subset is a subset with k elements.

The subset relation defines a partial order on sets. In fact, the subsets of a given set form a Boolean algebra under the subset relation, in which the join and meet are given by intersection and union, and the subset relation itself is the Boolean inclusion relation.

Definition
If A and B are sets and every element of A is also an element of B, then:
 B is a superset of A, denoted by 

If A is a subset of B, but A is not equal to B (i.e. there exists at least one element of B which is not an element of A), then: 

We may also partially order  by reverse set inclusion by defining 

When quantified,  is represented as 

We can prove the statement  by applying a proof technique known as the element argument:Let sets A and B be given. To prove that 

 suppose that a is a particular but arbitrarily chosen element of A
 show that a is an element of B.The validity of this technique can be seen as a consequence of Universal generalization: the technique shows  for an arbitrarily chosen element c.

In set theory, the notation  is also common, especially when  is a transfinite cardinal number.

Properties
 A  set A is a subset of B if and only if their intersection is equal to A.
Formally:

 A  set A is a subset of B if and only if their union is equal to B.
Formally:

 A finite set A is a subset of B, if and only if the cardinality of their intersection is equal to the cardinality of A.
Formally:

⊂ and ⊃ symbols

Similarly, using the convention that  is proper subset, if  then A may or may not equal B, but if  then A definitely does not equal B.

Examples of subsets 

 Any set is a subset of itself, but not a proper subset.
 The set {x: x is a prime number greater than 10} is a proper subset of {x: x is an odd number greater than 10}
 The set of natural numbers is a proper subset of the set of rational numbers; likewise, the set of points in a line segment is a proper subset of the set of points in a line. These are two examples in which both the subset and the whole set are infinite, and the subset has the same cardinality (the concept that corresponds to size, that is, the number of elements, of a finite set) as the whole; such cases can run counter to one's initial intuition.
 The set of rational numbers is a proper subset of the set of real numbers. In this example, both sets are infinite, but the latter set has a larger cardinality (or ) than the former set.

Another example in an Euler diagram:

Other properties of inclusion 

Inclusion is the canonical partial order, in the sense that every partially ordered set  is isomorphic to some collection of sets ordered by inclusion. The ordinal numbers are a simple example: if each ordinal n is identified with the set  of all ordinals less than or equal to n, then  if and only if 

See also
 Convex subset
 Inclusion order
 Region
 Subset sum problem
 Subsumptive containment
 Total subset

References

Bibliography

External links

Basic concepts in set theory